Beaver is a town and county seat in Beaver County, Oklahoma, United States.  The community is in the Oklahoma Panhandle.  As of the 2010 census, the town population was 1,515, a 3.5 percent decrease from 1,570 at the 2000 census.  The city is host to the annual World Cow Chip Throwing Championship. Held in April, "Cow Chip" brings attention from nearby cities with a parade, carnival, and cowchip throwing.

History
Beaver is located by Beaver River, also known as North Canadian River, and began as the location of a fur-trading post in 1879. Its original name was Beaver City,  and was planned to be the capital of the short-lived Cimarron Territory. The Federal government never recognized the proposed Territory, but Beaver City remained the center of business and law enforcement for the area. In 1890, the territory was assigned to Oklahoma Territory, and Beaver City became the seat for the entire Oklahoma Panhandle, then known as Seventh County.

Beaver began as a stop on the Jones and Plummer Trail. In 1880, Jim Lane built a house on the south side of Beaver Creek, that also served as a general store, saloon, hotel, and restaurant. Beaver slowly sprouted along the banks of Beaver Creek. The first post office had been established on the north side of the river in 1883. In 1884 Lane moved the post office to his store and became the postmaster. He also added a corral and livery stable to accommodate freighters and cattle drivers. The Presbyterian Church was built in 1887. It is listed on the National Register of Historic Places as ""the oldest church in Oklahoma Territory". The Groves Hotel (later renamed the Thompson Hotel) was said to be the first business in town, when it was built in 1885. In 1891, Carter Tracy opened a general hardware and implement store. The first newspaper, the Territorial Advocate, began printing in 1887.

Although the Oklahoma Panhandle is noted for its lack of rainfall, it is occasionally subjected to flash floods. One such event occurred early in Beaver's history, and flooded Main Street, where many of the businesses had been built. Another street, Douglas, had already been built, running south up a hill from the river, where the businesses relocated to prevent a recurrence.

The population grew to 112 in 1900, the main reason for its existence was to support cattle ranches located in the Panhandle area. In 1901–02, the Homestead Act encouraged farmers to move in to the area. Growth continued after the turn of 1900. A telephone exchange was built in 1905, and the Bank of Beaver City and the First National Bank, were established. The Beaver, Meade and Englewood Railroad (BME) was built to connect to the Missouri, Kansas and Texas Railway, a.k.a. M-K-T or "Katy" in Forgan, Oklahoma,  to the north. The BME track to Forgan was not completed until 1915. Meanwhile, the BME was extended into Texas and Cimarron Counties. Soon, the M-K-T bought the BME system for $2 million.

During the Dust Bowl and the Great Depression most of the Panhandle and its communities suffered great economic hardships and lost population. The city of Beaver actually gained population. In 1920, it had 920 residents, which grew to 1028 in 1930 and 1146 in 1940.

Between Beaver and Guymon along Beaver Creek there are several plains Indians ruins. They are on private property and not accessible to the public. These ruins are associated with the Buried City Plains Indian Ruins near Perryton, Texas.

Geography
Beaver is located at  (36.813486, −100.524298).

A mile north of the town is Beaver Dunes Park, now owned by the City of Beaver, featuring sand dunes left by ancient seas that once covered the area.

Climate
Beaver experiences a semi-arid climate (Köppen BSk) with cool, dry winters and hot, much wetter summers.

While not the snowiest location in Oklahoma ranked by highest annual average snowfall, Beaver has the distinction of holding the State snowfall record for 1 season, being the 87.3" which fell during 1911-1912.

Demographics

As of the census of 2010, there were 1,515 people living in the city. There were 702 housing units at an average density of 590 per square mile (230/km2). The racial makeup of the city was 92.48% White, 0.57% African American, 1.53% Native American, 0.06% Asian, 0.13% Pacific Islander, 3.69% from other races, and 1.53% from two or more races. Hispanic or Latino people of any race were 9.68% of the population.

There were 606 households, out of which 32.2% had children under the age of 18 living with them, 61.1% were married couples living together, 8.3% had a female householder with no husband present, and 28.1% were non-families. 26.2% of all households were made up of individuals, and 16.3% had someone living alone who was 65 years of age or older. The average household size was 2.43 and the average family size was 2.91.

In the city the population was spread out, with 25.4% under the age of 18, 6.1% from 18 to 24, 26.3% from 25 to 44, 20.8% from 45 to 64, and 21.5% who were 65 years of age or older. The median age was 39 years. For every 100 females, there were 95.0 males. For every 100 females age 18 and over, there were 92.8 males.

The median income for a household in the city was $37,560, and the median income for a family was $44,107. Males had a median income of $34,167 versus $19,511 for females. The per capita income for the city was $19,897. About 6.8% of families and 10.2% of the population were below the poverty line, including 12.9% of those under age 18 and 7.6% of those age 65 or over.

Economy
At the start of the twenty-first century, Beaver's economy was primarily based on cattle ranching, hog farms, wheat and milo farming and oil and gas production. Supporting these industries were such businesses as two banks, oil field suppliers, a hospital, a nursing home and two medical clinics.

Education
 Beaver Independent School District

Transportation

Highways
U.S. Route 270 runs concurrently with State 23 north/south through the town.

Airport
The Beaver Municipal Airport is located at the southern end of town, at coordinates 036° 47' 52.44"N 100° 31' 36.84"W.  The FAA Identifier is K44, and it has two runways used primarily for general aviation.  Runway 17/35 is 4050' x 60' with an asphalt surface, while 04/22 is a grass/turf field that is 2000' x 130'.

Historical sites
The Jones & Plummer Trail Museum offers a glimpse into the early days in and around the town through displays of historical artifacts and prototype rooms.

NRHP-listed sites include the Beaver County Courthouse, the Presbyterian Church, and the Lane Cabin at Main Street and Avenue C.

Notable people
 Nick Bobeck (1980-), football player and coach
 George Dobson (1851–1919), lawyer and politician
 Timothy Leonard (1940-), United States federal judge for the Western District of Oklahoma (since 1992; senior status since 2006)
 Robert Loofbourrow (1873–1926), pioneer settler, attorney and Associate Justice of the Oklahoma Supreme Court (1913–1915)
 Ross Rizley (1892–1969), politician and U.S. Representative from Oklahoma

See also

 Otasco
 Jones Plummer Trail
 Black Sunday, one of the worst dust storms during Dust Bowl
 Presbyterian Church (Beaver, Oklahoma)
 National Register of Historic Places listings in Beaver County, Oklahoma

Notes

References

Further reading

 2 v. illus. (part col.) 32 cm.

External links
 Town of Beaver
 Beaver Chamber of Commerce
 Beaver Dunes State Park
 Encyclopedia of Oklahoma History and Culture – Beaver
 Oklahoma Digital Maps: Digital Collections of Oklahoma and Indian Territory

Towns in Beaver County, Oklahoma
Towns in Oklahoma
Populated places established in 1879
County seats in Oklahoma
Oklahoma Panhandle